The Detonators is a reality series documentary which aired on the Discovery Channel. The program featured the thought process and procedures in performing demolition through the use of explosives.

The show was hosted by two demolition experts: Dr. Braden Lusk, an assistant professor at the University of Kentucky College of Engineering, and Dr. Paul Worsey, professor and director of explosives engineering education at the Missouri University of Science and Technology. Lusk and Worsey gave the viewers a behind-the-scenes look at the science of destroying large structures without damaging the surrounding buildings and landscapes.

The Detonators consisted of a single season with 13 episodes airing between January and July 2009. No additional episodes have been produced since.

Episode list

Broadcast Airings
Repeats of the series aired on the digital broadcast network Quest in mid-2020; however, the network says "No upcoming air dates currently scheduled for this program."

References

External links
 
 The Detonators  Released in the UK on DVD for the first time by Delta 28-11-2011
 The Detonators – QUEST NETWORK
https://www.discovery.com/tv-shows/the-detonators/ 

Discovery Channel original programming
2000s American reality television series
2009 American television series debuts
2009 American television series endings